The Escuela Catolica De San Sebastian (ECSS) is the parochial school of San Sebastian Parish in Pinabuhatan, Pasig. It is a part of the Pasig Diocesan School System and Manila Archdiocesan Parish and School Administration. It was founded in 1996 as a Jesus's Messianic Office of Teaching.

History

The institution started as the Jesus’ Messianic Office of Teaching, founded in August 1996 as part of Manila Archdiocesan and Parochial Schools Association. The school was founded as a department of San Sebastian Parish in Pinagbuhatan, Pasig. It started to offer Early Childhood Education classes. It was renamed as Escuela Catolica de San Sebastian in 1998 and became the parochial school of the San Sebastian. In 2003, the Diocese of Pasig was established and an diocesan school system was formed that will supervise all catholic schools in Pasig, Pateros and Taguig. Through this, the school operated under the Pasig Catholic College. In 2004, it was recognized by the Department of Education.

The school started with only two teachers in the kinder level. As the school started to offer grade school classes, the school academic and professional staff grew. They were led by four school directors: Rev. Fr. David C. Colong, Rev. Fr. Ronnie M. Samaniego, Rev. Fr. Elpidio M. Geneta, and the incumbent Rev. Fr. Emmanuel C. Hipolito.

Campus
Main Building
Beside the San Sebastian Parish at Pinagbuhatan, Pasig, Escuela Catolica De San Sebastian's Main Building is a four-storey building with 11 classrooms, 2 laboratories, a Faculty Room, Administration Office, Clinic, TLE room and 2 Audio-Visual rooms (one is currently on construction). The first floor of the building consists of the air-conditioned rooms: the Early Childhood Education classroom, the Computer Laboratory, the Library, the Administration Office, the School Director's office and the Principal's Office. The clinic is apart from the building, beside the church; while the canteen is beside the gate. The Audio-Visual room is planned to be a 2-floor facility; the second floor is now constructed while the first floor is now in construction beside the Administration Office and will be finished in late 2012.

The grade 1, 2, 3, and 4 rooms, comprising most of the elementary rooms, are on the second floor. The TLE room and the second floor of AVR are also in the second floor.

The Grade 5, 6, and 7 classes are held every day in the third floor. The floor also contains the Science Laboratory and a small Physics Room.

In the building's last floor, the Grade 8, 9, and 10 teachers conducts classes and activity. A storage room is also present in the area.

Administration and Organization
Administration
 
Rev. Fr. Daniel Estacio is the School Director since 2021, and the School Chaplain is Rev. Fr. Feliciano Gutierrez;  Dr. Asuncion Cansana is the school Principal

References

Schools in Pasig
Catholic elementary schools in Metro Manila
Catholic secondary schools in Metro Manila
Educational institutions established in 1996